The following is a list of health and medical strikes:

20th century
 Hôpital Notre-Dame anti-Jewish strike – 1934
 Saskatchewan doctors' strike – 1962
 Belgium physicians' and dentists' strike in 1964, April 1 to April 18, 1964
 Quebec specialist doctors strike - 08/10/1970
 UK consultants' strike – January to April 1975
 UK junior doctors' strike – November 1975
 Alberta Nurses Strike – 1982
 Israel – 1983 
 Australian nurses 50-day strike - 1986
 Manitoba Nurses Strike – 1991
 Sweden – Doctors strike 1994

21st century

2001 

 Finland - historical five-month strike

2003 

 Scottish Nursery Nurses Strike – 2003-2004

2006 

 
 New Zealand – 15–20 June 2006

2009 

 Switzerland – Vaud and Geneva cantons – March 2009

2010 

 Sudanese Doctors' Strike – March 2010

2012 

 Germany – Doctors' strike March 2012
 India – nationwide strike June 2012

2013

 UK Save our A&E (Lewisham) – January 2013
 Jamaica Junior Medical Doctors April 2013

2014

 England (UK) NHS Pay Strike – September 2014

2015

 UK Midwives Strike – January 2015
 Northern Ireland Midwives Strike – April 2015
 Brazil - Resident doctors strike – September and December 2015
 England – Junior Doctors' Strikes – November 2015
 France – Doctors' strike – 18 November 2015
 UK NHS Student Protest – December 2015

2016

 UK NHS Student Protest – January 2016 
 England Junior Doctors' Strikes – January to April 2016
 Peru doctors' strike – 17 February 2016
 England Junior Doctors' Strikes – March 2016
 Kenya doctors strike December 5, 2016
 Sudan Doctors strike October and November

2019

 Sudan Doctors strike January.
 2019 Indian Doctors' strike.
 2019 UCSF Medical Residents Walk Off.
 2019 University of Washington resident's strike: 80-hour weeks, bad pay, exhaustion.
 2019 Hospitals’ strike in Lebanon

2020

 2020 Hong Kong Hospital Workers to Strike Over Coronavirus 
 2020 South Korean junior doctors and medical students go on strike to protest medical reform plan
2020 University of Illinois Hospital strikes
 2020 United States, Washington physicians and advanced providers of the Union of American Physicians and Dentists (UAPD) go on strike over unsafe working conditions at MultiCare Indigo Urgent Care clinics

2021 

 2021 Bolivian doctors' strike
2021 St. Charles Bend strike
2021 Saint Vincent Hospital strike
2021 Nigerian doctors strike
2021 New Zealand nurses strike
 Malaysian contract doctors' strike

2022 
 UK 2022 National Health Service strikes

References

History of medicine